Community Sha Tin was a local political group based in Sha Tin formed in 2017 by a group of pro-democracy Sha Tin District Councillors. It was disbanded in 2021 following the change of political atmosphere in Hong Kong.

History
The group was formed on 14 December 2017 by nine members of the Sha Tin District Council, including former Neo Democrats councillors Yau Man-chun, Billy Chan Shiu-yeung, Chiu Chu-pong and Hui Yui-yu, former Democratic Party's Chan Nok-hang and Ting Tsz-yuen, Labour Party's Yip Wing and two post-Occupy "umbrella soldiers" Lai Tsz-yan and Wong Hok-lai, to consolidate the pro-democratic force in the council.

Amid the intra-party conflicts between Democratic Party Legislative Councillor Lam Cheuk-ting and the members who were both members of the party's New Territories East branch members and Concern Group for Tseung Kwan O People's Livelihood (CGPLTKO), Ting Tsz-yuen, Community Sha Tin's convenor also quit the Democratic Party over the dual-membership allegation.

Community Sha Tin had many candidates overlapping with Democratic Party's candidates in the 2019 District Council elections, including the newly created Di Yee, where Tse Kit-wing and Democratic Party's Liu Qing contested in the same constituency. Due to the clashes, some candidates of the group were not endorsed by Power for Democracy.

Community Sha Tin announced immediate dissolution at Facebook on 25 June 2021. Former vice-counvenor Chiu Chu-pong said it is a tough decision after considering the current political atmosphere. Chiu also mentioned the limitations of achieving community work under the party brand, and hence decided to dissolve the party.

Performance in elections

Sha Tin District Council elections

Representatives

District Councils
The Community Sha Tin held ten seats in Sha Tin District Council (2020–2023) at dissolution:

References

External links
Community Sha Tin's facebook page

Political parties in Hong Kong
Political parties established in 2017
2017 establishments in Hong Kong
Political parties disestablished in 2021
2021 disestablishments in Hong Kong
Liberal parties in Hong Kong